Snopieris dubernardi bromkampi is a subspecies of Sinopieris dubernardi, a butterfly in the genus Sinopieris. It was described by Otto Bang-Haas in 1938. It can be found in southeast Tibet.

References

Pierini
Butterfly subspecies
Taxa named by Otto Bang-Haas